Llenas is a surname. Notable people with the surname include:

Bryan Llenas (born 1988), American television news correspondent
Francesc Llenas (born 1982), Spanish volleyball player
Winston Llenas (born 1943), Dominican baseball player

See also
 Llena